The .35 Winchester (colloquially .35 Win) cartridge was created in 1903 by the Winchester Repeating Arms Company for use in the Winchester Model 1895 lever-action rifle, and was also available in the bolt action Remington-Lee, or the Model E-10 Factory Sporter Ross Rifle in Canada.

Description and performance
Because of the 1895 rifle's box magazine pointed bullets may be used which enhance the long range effectiveness of the cartridge. While obsolete, it is generally considered sufficient for all large game animals in North America. .30-40 Krag brass can be used to form .35 Winchester cases.

It was intended to be a medium-sized caliber falling between the .30-40 Krag and the .405 Winchester, and so it outperformed the .33 Winchester but was less potent than the .348 or .358.Enough at short or medium ranges against moose, elk, or even brown bear, it is suitable for any big game in North America, though it lacks the versatility of more modern rounds.

It was dropped in 1936, along with the 1895 rifle. Loads developing 45,000 CUP or over should be avoided in the old 1895 lever guns.

Ballistics
Data from the Lyman Ideal Hand Book, 40

See also
 List of rifle cartridges
 9mm caliber

References

Pistol and rifle cartridges
Winchester Repeating Arms Company cartridges